Allison Kina Hightower (born April 6, 1988) is an American professional women's basketball player who last played for the Washington Mystics of the Women's National Basketball Association (WNBA). She was drafted 15th overall in the 2010 WNBA Draft.

High school career
Hightower was born in Dallas, Texas was named a WBCA All-American.  She participated in the 2006 WBCA High School All-America Game, where she scored five points.

College career
Hightower attended Louisiana State University, where she was named all first-team Southeastern Conference (SEC) following her senior season. She was also named SEC All-Defensive Team following her junior (2009) and senior (2010) seasons.

College statistics

Source

Professional

Highwater played in the WNBA 2010–2014, and in 2017. 
She is currently playing in the European Basketball League and in the Israel Basketball league as part of the Israeli team, Maccabi Bnot Ashdod.

References

External links

LSU Lady Tigers bio 

1988 births
Living people
American women's basketball players
Basketball players from Dallas
Connecticut Sun draft picks
Connecticut Sun players
Guards (basketball)
LSU Lady Tigers basketball players
Parade High School All-Americans (girls' basketball)
Women's National Basketball Association All-Stars
Washington Mystics players
21st-century American women